The Dashanbao Black-necked Crane National Nature Reserve is a state-level nature reserve located in Dashanbao Township, Zhaoyang District, Zhaotong prefecture-level city, Yunnan Province, China. The reserve has been set up to protect a total area of 19,200 hectares of plateau marshland at altitudes between 2,200 and 3,300 meters that provide winter habitat for the Black-necked crane. The reserve has been designated as a Ramsar site since 2004.

References

Nature reserves in China
Ramsar sites in China
Geography of Zhaotong